The 1937 British Columbia general election was the nineteenth general election in the Province of British Columbia, Canada. It was held to elect members of the Legislative Assembly of British Columbia. The election was called on April 14, 1937, and held on June 1, 1937.  The new legislature met for the first time on October 26, 1937.

The governing Liberal Party, despite winning only 37% of the popular vote, benefited from the split in the vote between the Conservative Party and the Co-operative Commonwealth Federation, and won a solid majority of the seats in the legislature.

The rift in the Conservative Party that led to its decision not to nominate candidates in the 1933 election had been resolved, and the party was able to form the official opposition.

The Conservatives and CCF each won about 29% of the vote, and only 8 seats and 7 seats, respectively. The remaining two seats were won by Labour and Independent candidates.

Results

Notes:

* Party did not nominate candidates in the previous election.

1 Results compared to those of Unionist Party of British Columbia in previous election.

Results by riding

|-
||    
|align="center"  |George Sharratt Pearson
|align="center"  |Alberni-Nanaimo<small>Liberal
||    
||    
|align="center"  |Chilliwack<small>Conservative
|align="center"  |Leslie Harvey Eyres
||    
|-
||    
|align="center"  |William James Asselstine
|align="center"  |Atlin<small>Liberal
||    
||    
|align="center"  |Dewdney<small>Conservative
|align="center"  |Frank Porter Patterson
||    
|-
||    
|align="center"  |Louis LeBourdais
|align="center"  |Cariboo<small>Liberal
||    
||    
|align="center"  |Esquimalt<small>Conservative
|align="center"  |Elmer Victor Finland
||    
|-
||    
|align="center"  |Thomas King
|align="center"  |Columbia<small>Liberal
||    
||    
|align="center"  |The Islands<small>Conservative
|align="center"  |Macgregor Fullarton MacIntosh
||    
|-
||    
|align="center"  |Frank Mitchell MacPherson
|align="center"  |Cranbrook<small>Liberal
||    
||    
|align="center" rowspan=2 |Vancouver-Point Grey<small>Conservative
|align="center"  |Royal Lethington Maitland2
||    
|-
||    
|align="center"  |Henry George Thomas Perry
|align="center"  |Fort George<small>Liberal
||    
||    
|align="center"  |James Alexander Paton
||    
|-
||    
|align="center"  |Robert Henry Carson
|align="center"  |Kamloops<small>Liberal
||    
||    
|align="center" rowspan=2 |Victoria City<small>Conservative
|align="center"  |Herbert Anscomb
||    
|-
||    
|align="center"  |Ezra Churchill Henniger
|align="center"  |Grand Forks-Greenwood<small>Liberal
||    
||    
|align="center"  |Joseph Douglas Hunter
||    
|-
||    
|align="center"  |Charles Sidney Leary
|align="center"  |Kaslo-Slocan<small>Liberal
||    
||    
|align="center"  |Burnaby<small>Co-operative Commonwealth Fed.
|align="center"  |Ernest Edward Winch
||    
|-
||    
|align="center"  |George Matheson Murray
|align="center"  |Lillooet<small>Liberal
||    
||    
|align="center"  |Comox<small>Co-operative Commonwealth Fed.
|align="center"  |Colin Cameron
||    
|-
||    
|align="center"  |John Melvin Bryan, Sr.
|align="center"  |Mackenzie<small>Liberal
||    
||    
|align="center"  |Cowichan-Newcastle<small>Co-operative Commonwealth Fed.
|align="center"  |Samuel Guthrie
||    
|-
||    
|align="center"  |Frank Putnam
|align="center"  |Nelson-Creston<small>Liberal
||    
||    
|align="center"  |Delta<small>Co-operative Commonwealth Fed.
|align="center"  |Leonard Alec Shepherd
||    
|-
||    
|align="center"  |Arthur Wellesley Gray
|align="center"  |New Westminster<small>Liberal
||    
||    
|align="center"  |North Vancouver<small>Co-operative Commonwealth Fed.
|align="center"  |Dorothy Steeves
||    
|-
||    
|align="center"  |Kenneth Cattanach MacDonald
|align="center"  |North Okanagan<small>Liberal
||    
||    
|align="center" rowspan=2 |Vancouver East<small>Co-operative Commonwealth Fed.
|align="center"  |James Lyle Telford
||    
|-
||    
|align="center"  |Mark Matthew Connelly
|align="center"  |Omineca<small>Liberal
||    
||    
|align="center"  |Harold Edward Winch
||    
|-
||    
|align="center"  |Glen Everton Braden
|align="center"  |Peace River<small>Liberal
||    
||    
|align="center"  |Fernie<small>Labour (Party)
|align="center"  |Thomas Aubert Uphill
||    
|-
||    
|align="center"  |Thomas Dufferin Pattullo 1
|align="center"  |Prince Rupert<small>Liberal
||    
||    
|align="center"  |Salmon Arm<small>Independent
|align="center"  |Rolf Wallgren Bruhn
||    
|-
||    
|align="center"  |Harry Johnston
|align="center"  |Revelstoke<small>Liberal
||    
|-
||    
|align="center"  |Richard Ronald Burns
|align="center"  |Rossland-Trail<small>Liberal
||    
|-
||    
|align="center"  |Norman William Whittaker
|align="center"  |Saanich<small>Liberal
||    
|-
||    
|align="center"  |Charles Herbert Percy Tupper
|align="center"  |Similkameen<small>Liberal
||    
|-
||    
|align="center"  |Edward Tourtellotte Kenney
|align="center"  |Skeena<small>Liberal
||    
|-
||    
|align="center"  |Cecil Robert Bull
|align="center"  |South Okanagan<small>Liberal
||    
|-
||    
|align="center"  |John Howard Forester
|align="center" rowspan=2 |Vancouver-Burrard<small>Liberal
||    
|-
||    
|align="center"  |Helen Douglas Smith
||    
|-
||    
|align="center"  |Fred Crone
|align="center" rowspan=2 |Vancouver Centre<small>Liberal
||    
|-
||    
|align="center"  |Gordon Sylvester Wismer
||    
|-
||    
|align="center"  |George Moir Weir
|align="center"  |Vancouver-Point Grey<small>Liberal
||    
|-
||    
|align="center"  |John Hart 
|align="center" rowspan=2 |Victoria City<small>Liberal
||    
|-
||    
|align="center"  |William Thomas Straith
||    
|-
||    
|align="center"  |John Joseph Alban Gillis
|align="center"  |Yale<small>Liberal
||    
|-
|-
|
|align="center"|1  Premier-Elect and Incumbent
|
|
|
|
|-
|
|align="center"|2  Leader of the Opposition
|-
| align="center" colspan="10"|Source:''' Elections BC
|-
|}

See also
List of British Columbia political parties

Notes

Further reading
 

1937
1937 elections in Canada
1937 in British Columbia
June 1937 events